Oksana Fadeyeva (born 16 March 1975) (née Kushch) is a Russian table tennis player.

She competed at the 2008 Summer Olympics, reaching the first round of the singles competition. She competed in both singles and doubles in 2004.

See also
 List of table tennis players

References

2008 Olympic profile

1975 births
Living people
Russian female table tennis players
Table tennis players at the 2000 Summer Olympics
Table tennis players at the 2004 Summer Olympics
Table tennis players at the 2008 Summer Olympics
Olympic table tennis players of Russia